The Secret River is a play by Australian playwright Andrew Bovell, based upon the novel of the same name by Kate Grenville.

Synopsis 
Narrated by Dhirrumbin (originally played by Ursula Yovich), the drama is about a man who is exiled from London in the  eighteenth century, and is sent with his family to a penal colony in the Hawkesbury River, New South Wales, where he hopes to make a new start, but its Indigenous inhabitants, the Dharug people, are not willing to give up their land.

Performances
Produced by the Sydney Theatre Company, the play was first performed on 8 January 2013 at the Sydney Theatre.

A 2016 remount toured Sydney, Melbourne, and Brisbane.

In March 2017, a co-production of the State Theatre Company of South Australia and the Sydney Theatre Company, co-directed by Neil Armfield and Geordie Brookman, was staged at Anstey Hill Quarry as part of the Adelaide Festival. The show was a record-breaking success, selling out all performances over its 18 nights, with an audience of 800 each night.

Characters

English settlers
William Thornhill, 
Sal Thornhill, Williams wife
Willie Thornhill, William and Sal's eldest son
Dick Thornhill, William and Sal's second son
Smasher Sullivan, a settler on the Hawkesbury River
Thomas Blackwood, an ex-convict and tradesmen
Loveday, a settler on the Hawkesbury River
Dan Oldfield, Williams childhood friend
Mrs Herring, a mid-wife and nurse
Sagitty Birtles, Smasher Sullivan's crony
Captain Suckling, alcoholic and landowner

Dharug people
Dhirrumbin, a guide
Dulla Djin
Gillyagan
Muruli
Garraway, friend of Dick
Yalamundi,  elder of the tribe 
Buryia, female tribe elder
Ngalamalum
Wangarra, tribal warrior
Branyimala, tribal warrior
Narabi, friend of Dick
Turnkey

Original cast
Nathaniel Dean - William Thornhill
Anita Hegh - Sal Thornhill
Jeremy Sims - Smasher Sullivan
Colin Moody - Thomas Blackwood
Ursula Yovich - Dhirrumbin/Dulla Djin
Miranda Tapsell - Gillyagan/Muruli
Bruce Spence - Loveday
Bailey Doomadgee and Kamil Ellis - Garraway
Lachlan Elliott and Callum McManis - Willie Thornhill
Rory Potter and Tom Usher - Dick Thornhill
Roy Gordon - Yalamundi
Daniel Henshall - Dan Oldfield
Ethel-Anne Gundy – Buryia
Trevor Jamieson - Ngalamalum
Rhimi Johnson Page - Wangarra/Branyimala
Judith McGrath - Mrs Herring
James Slee - Narabi
Matthew Sunderland - Sagitty Birtles/ Captain Suckling/Turnkey
Source:

Awards and nominations

Helpmann awards

References

External link
 

2013 plays
Plays about race and ethnicity
Plays based on books
Plays set in the 18th century
Plays set in Australia
Works about racism
Plays by Andrew Bovell